Pavol Poliaček (born 4 February 1988) is a Slovak football midfielder who currently plays for FK Dukla Banská Bystrica, on loan from TJ Stráža.

External links
 MŠK Žilina profile
 
 

1988 births
Living people
Sportspeople from Žilina
Slovak footballers
Association football midfielders
MŠK Žilina players
FK Dubnica players
TJ Baník Ružiná players
Slovak Super Liga players
Czech First League players
FC Baník Ostrava players
SK Dynamo České Budějovice players
FK Dukla Banská Bystrica players
Expatriate footballers in the Czech Republic